James Bernard De Courcey Emtage (14 February 1902 – 12 August 1995) was a Barbadian writer, who published as J. B. Emtage. He was also a cricketer, who played in one first-class match for the Barbados cricket team in 1921/22.

Life
Emtage was educated at The Lodge School in Barbados, and Magdalen College, Oxford. He married Laurence May Briggs.

Works
 Ski Fever. London: Methuen & Co, 1936. With pictures by Lewis Baumer.
 Brown Sugar: a vestigial tale. London: Collins, 1966.
 Foolscap and Bells. Bognor Regis: New Horizon, 1982.
 Miss Cheevus: Polemical Novel. Moving Finger Books, 1993.

See also
 List of Barbadian representative cricketers

References

External links
 

1902 births
1995 deaths
Barbadian novelists
Barbadian cricketers
Barbados cricketers
People from Saint John, Barbados